MS Fæmund II is a historic passenger ferry that each summer travels between Sørvika (south of Røros) and Elgå (in Engerdal) on Norway's third largest lake, Femunden.

General information
From 1905 the steamship has transported goods, post, people and lumber. Since there are still no road connection to some houses, the boat is still important for many inhabitants. While the main income in the past was the freight of lumber and heavy cargoes the boat today is mainly used as a ferry, to transport the many tourists seeking the national parks to go hiking.

History
For the last 17 years, the steamship has sailed its way through Femunden with its dark coloured hull. But, in 2009 the boat company and owner of the steamship decided to paint the whole boat white. Today, the steamship is in its original colour.

In 1958 the old steam engine was replaced with a diesel engine.

Facilities
The boat holds 100 passengers and has service on board. The boat operates between 15 June and mid-September.

References

External links

 

1905 ships
Ships built in Trondheim
Ships of Norway
Ferries of Norway
Engerdal
Røros